Quincy is a commune in the Cher department in the Centre-Val de Loire region of France.

Geography
Quincy is a village located at 10 km of Vierzon and Bourges. Mehun-sur-Yèvre (5000 inhabitants) is a medium-size town located near Quincy. It is famous for its castle, built by King Charles VII. The river Cher flows through Quincy.

Population

Sights
 The church of St. Germain, dating from the eighteenth century.
 The eighteenth-century chateau.

See also
Communes of the Cher department

References

External links 
 

Communes of Cher (department)